See Lists of video games for related lists.
This is a comprehensive index of turn-based tactics video games, sorted chronologically. Information regarding date of release, developer, platform, setting and notability is provided when available. The table can be sorted by clicking on the small boxes next to the column headings.

Legend

List of released games

References

Timelines of video games
Turn-based tactics